Ted Charlton may refer to:

Ted Charlton (New Zealand footballer), New Zealand international footballer in the 1960s
Ted Charlton (footballer, born 1888) (1888–1978), English football defender